Fukou Town is an urban town in and subdivision of Lianyuan, Hunan Province, People's Republic of China.

Administrative division
The town is divided into 62 villages and 1 community, the following areas: 
 
  Fukou Community
  Lijia Village
  Huishuiwan Village
  Wujiaqiao Village
  Changtang Village
  Chixing Village
  Wenxi Village
  Jiangbai Village
  Baijia Village
  Bajiao Village
  Pengjia Village
  Chenjia Village
  Banshan Village
  Shizi Village
  Fukou Village
  Linjia Village
  Hejiadang Village
  Banpai Village
  Maoyuan Village
  Liangxiang Village
  Songshan Village
  Xujia Village
  Daxing Village
  Dabo Village
  Hujiaping Village
  Paixia Village
  Dazhu Village
  Jinpan Village
  Wenquan Village
  Yijia Village
  Chang'ao Village
  Luosi Village
  Ganhe Village
  Huashan Village
  Yujia Village
  Shilian Village
  Qishu Village
  Long'an Village
  Gantang Village
  Dawan Village
  Shaxi Village
  Huangchen Village
  Jianhua Village
  Canming Village
  Dajia Village
  Dacha Village
  Guojia Village
  Zhangjia Village
  Jianmin Village
  Wutongyuan Village
  Xinkai Village
  Wanshou Village
  Jintie Village
  Biaojiang Village
  Zetang Village
  Maogongyan Village
  Yanziyuan Village
  Dama Village
  Baishu Village
  Meiwan Village
  Zhongma Village
  Longtou Village
  Xiakou Village

External links

Divisions of Lianyuan